Isertieae is a tribe of flowering plants in the family Rubiaceae and contains about 16 species in 2 genera. Its representatives are found in tropical America.

Genera 
Currently accepted names

 Isertia Schreb. (14 sp)
 Kerianthera J.H.Kirkbr. (2 sp)

Synonyms

 Brignolia DC. = Isertia
 Bruinsmania Miq. = Isertia
 Cassupa Humb. & Bonpl. = Isertia
 Creatantha Standl. = Isertia
 Phosanthus Raf. = Isertia
 Yutajea Steyerm. = Isertia

References 

 
Cinchonoideae tribes